D'Ering Memorial Wildlife Sanctuary is a protected area in Arunachal Pradesh, India, with an area of . It was established in 1978.

Most of this sanctuary, about 80% is covered with grass, the rest are riverine forests mixed with bamboo and secondary forests.

The sanctuary is 13km away from Pasighat, home to a variety of plants, trees and animals. Here you will meet two big cats, a tiger and a leopard.

References

External links

Wildlife sanctuaries in Arunachal Pradesh
Protected areas established in 1978
1978 establishments in Arunachal Pradesh